"Get on Up" is a song written by Johnny Taylor, Gilbert Moorer, and Bill Sheppard and performed by The Esquires. It was featured on their 1967 album, Get on Up and Get Away and was produced by Bill Sheppard.

Chart performance
"Get on Up" reached #3 on the US R&B chart and No.11 on the Billboard Hot 100 in 1967. The single ranked 34th on the Billboard Year-End Hot 100 singles of 1967.
The band released an updated version in 1976 entitled "Get on Up '76" which reached No.62 on the US R&B chart.

Song sampling
"Get on Up" was sampled in Carmen Electra's "Everybody Get on Up" on her 1993 album, Carmen Electra. The song reached No.33 on the US Dance chart.

References

1967 songs
1967 debut singles
1976 singles
The Esquires songs